Magnolia Cemetery is a historic cemetery located in Augusta, Georgia. It was officially founded in August 1818. Spanning over 60 acres, it is home to the final resting place of seven Confederate Generals,  five Jewish cemeteries, a Greek Cemetery, and the oldest tree in the state of Georgia,.

History
The land where Magnolia Cemetery is located was at one time part of a plantation with the first official burial in August 1818. Academy of Richmond County owned the first two blocks and they sold it to the City Council of Augusta for $800 in 1817.

Notable interments 
Edward Porter Alexander, Confederate Brigadier General
Ward Allen, duck hunter and merchant
Goode Bryan, Confederate General
Victor Girardey, Confederate Brigadier General
John King Jackson, Confederate Brigadier General
John Martin, American Revolutionary War Soldier, lived to the age of 105
James Ryder Randall, poet and educator
William Duncan Smith, Confederate General
Marcellus A. Stovall, Confederate General
Thomas Wightman, painter
Ambrose Wright, Confederate Major General

External links 

Augusta, Georgia - Magnolia Cemetery

Cemeteries in Georgia (U.S. state)
Augusta, Georgia
1818 establishments in Georgia (U.S. state)